Radio piracy may refer to:
Pirate radio, unlicensed radio broadcasting
Copyright infringement of music ripped from AM or FM radio broadcasts